Wilson Tiago Matías (born September 14, 1983 in Limeira) is a Brazilian professional footballer who plays as a defensive midfielder. He is a Mexican naturalized citizen.

Career
Before coming to Monarcas Morelia he played for Ituano Futebol Clube. He made his debut with Monarcas Morelia against Cruz Azul, which ended in a 2–1 victory for Cruz Azul. After a difficult debut with a red card, he started to earn his spot in the squad. Wilson Matías had the second most appearances of any club member at the time, just behind goalkeeper Moisés Muñoz. After five years in Mexico for Monarcas Morelia he signed on December 30, 2009 a contract with Internacional. He is a naturalized citizen of Mexico.

Honours

Club
Internacional
Copa Libertadores: 2010
Campeonato Gaúcho: 2011
Recopa Sudamericana: 2011

References

External links
 

1983 births
Living people
People from Limeira
Association football midfielders
Brazilian footballers
Brazilian expatriate footballers
Brazilian emigrants to Mexico
Naturalized citizens of Mexico
Campeonato Brasileiro Série A players
Liga MX players
União São João Esporte Clube players
Ituano FC players
Atlético Morelia players
Sport Club Internacional players
Associação Portuguesa de Desportos players
Deportivo Toluca F.C. players
Footballers from São Paulo (state)